Slow Dance is the second album by Jeremy Jay, released by K Records.

The album received critical acclaim. In its review, Pitchfork wrote that Jay played a "garage-rock and frigid post-punk as a backdrop for romanticized pop fantasy". Critic Marc Hogan described the song "In this Lonely Town" as a "vivid scene" of a film. Spin hailed the album, saying "his quietly unsettling aura perfectly suits" the songs. Tiny Mix Tapes praised Slow Dance and wrote : "This is one of the smartest indie-pop albums in recent years". Les Inrockuptibles also praised the album.

The album was released on vinyl and CD. Two singles were taken from Slow Dance: "We Were There" and "Breaking the Ice". "We Were There" was first released on vinyl 7" inch with the B-side "Beautiful Dreamer".  "Breaking the Ice" was then released on 7" inch vinyl with two extra tracks, "Winter Wonder" and "Words of Love".

Track listing
 We Were There
 In This Lonely Town
 Gallop
 Canter Canter
 Slow Dance
 Winter Wonder
 Will You Dance with Me?
 Breaking the Ice
 Slow Dance 2
 Where Could We Go Tonight?

Personnel 
Derek James – bass
Jeremy Jay – synthesizer, guitar, piano, vocals, producer
Ilya Malinsky – guitar, synth, drums
Nick Pahl – drums

References

2009 albums
Jeremy Jay albums
K Records albums